Järvsöfaks (23 June 1994 – 19 October 2020) was a Swedish trotter. He held the current coldblood trotter's world record in wins, consecutive wins (42), and the coldblood trotter world record time, 1:17.9 per kilometre. His bloodlines included both Swedish and Norwegian coldblood trotters.

Järvsöfaks was driven and trained by Jan-Olov Persson. He was an award-winning sire in Sweden, and some of his offspring have winnings of millions of Swedish kronor.

Biography 
Järvsöfaks was foaled on 23 June 1994, out of Järvsö Anna and by Trollfaks. He has been bred, owned, trained and driven, almost exclusively, by Persson.

His trotting career started at age 3 in 1997, and ended at age 15 in 2009. With the win in his last race on 28 December 2009, he totally won 201 out of 234 races. During his career he earned 21,288,570 Swedish kronor in prize money.

In 2004, Järvsöfaks came down with the rare condition called the Baron Gruff disease. The disease starts abruptly and develops quickly, but Järvsöfaks had treatment quickly enough and recovered. He returned to competition at the end of the same year.

After this, Järvsöfaks was given a position of honour in the Royal Guards and in the Life Guards. In 2005, editor Robert Opku wrote a book about the stallion in co-operation with Persson. The book was finished a couple of days after Järvsöfaks broke the world record in the Gävletravet race on 12 July 2005, with his time 1:17.9 per kilometre. The previous world record, 1:18.6, had been held by the Norwegian Spikeld.

Järvsöfaks received the Horse of the Year award in Sweden three times in a row from 2003 to 2005. He was also given the title of the Coldblood of the Year twelve times 1998-2009.

From 2000 to 2013 Järvsöfaks served in breeding. He had sired 874 foals in Sweden. Some of his offspring are Hallsta Lotus, Åkre Lurifax, Faksen Jr. and Fakse, all of which have won for their sire in racing. However, when Järvsöfaks won his 10th Swedish Championship at age 15, he beat five of his sons, including Hallsta Lotus, Åkre Lurifax and Fakse.

Järvsöfaks died on 19 October 2020 in Hudiksvall, Sweden, aged 26.

Record
On 5 December 2008, Järvsöfaks met Sabin's Swedish record and on 26 December he broke Alm Svarten's world record in wins with his 184th heat on the Bergsåker race track.

Accomplishments 
Triple Horse of the Year in Sweden (Årets häst) in 2003, 2004 and 2005
Coldblood of the Year in Sweden (Årets kallblod) twelve times 1998-2009
World record for coldblood trotters in consecutive wins (42)
World record in wins (201) for coldblood trotters, though three finnhorses have more wins: Reipas 348 during the 1950s and '60s, Vonkaus 317, and Topas 284
World record for coldblood trotters in short (1:17.9) and mid-length distances 
Won 88% of his heats (234: 201-16-4)
Won the Elitkampen race in 2002-2006, and has won 10 Swedish Championships, 5 international matches, the Norskt Derby race, and the Tapiolan Erkon Pokaali race thrice (last in 2007).

Pedigree

References 

Om Järvsöfaks
Bilder och fakta om Järvsöfaks
Kort om Järvsöfaks

External links 

Jan-Olov Persson's official homesite 
Järvsöfaks vid beridna högvakten och livgardet 
Pictures from Gävlestä 

1994 racehorse births
2020 racehorse deaths
Harness racing in Sweden